Prospect is an independent TV production company part of production and distribution group DCD Media.
Prospect has offices in London. The company produce a wide array of programming for the UK and international markets. Productions range from factual entertainment series and documentaries to long-running daytime shows.

Founded in 1988, Prospect built its reputation through being one of the UK ’s largest suppliers of lifestyle and cookery programming, most notably with ITV1's long-running 'Cooks!' series fronted by celebrity chef Antony Worrall Thompson.

In 2006, Prospect topped the Broadcast magazine "Indies League Table 2006" in the Factual Entertainment category.

In 2011 Prospect Cymru launched a new Topical Programming Unit specializing in current affairs and fast turnaround topical programming. In 2012 Prospect's programmes won 2 BAFTA Wales awards and 4 nominations, BAFTA Television and RTS nominations, and IFTA Irish Film & Television Festival.

Programmes
Notable productions include:

The Tallest Tower: Building The Shard for Channel 4
Shirley for BBC Two
The Hunt for Britain's Metal Thieves for BBC OneGipsy Eviction: The Fight for Dale Farm for Dispatches Channel 4Misbehaving Mums To Be for BBC ThreeThe Passion of Port Talbot for BBC WalesChildren of 9/11: Revealed for Channel 5Tourettes: I Swear I Can't Help It for BBC OneDaily Cooks Challenge for ITV presented by Antony Worrall ThompsonChristmas Cooks for ITV presented by Antony Worrall ThompsonFix My Fat Head for BBC OneThe RAF at 90' for BBC TwoDo It Yourself – The Story of Rough Trade for BBC FourMy Brilliant Britain'' for Blighty
There's No Business

References

External links
Prospect Pictures
DCD Media
Rize USA
Matchlight
September Films
DCD Rights
DCD publishing

Television production companies of the United Kingdom